Pisinna rekohuana is a species of marine gastropod mollusc in the family Anabathridae. First described by Badwn Powell in 1933 as Estea rekohuana, it is endemic to the waters of New Zealand. There are two subspecies of the gastropod: Pisinna rekohuana rekohuana, primarily found in the south and Pisinna rekohuana lactorubra, primarily found on the north-east coast of the North Island.

Description

Powell described the species as follows:

Pisinna rekohuana is similar in appearance to Pisinna minor and Pisinna subfusca, and can be identified by its size (intermediate between the two) and relatively larger aperture.

A subspecies, Pisinna rekohuana lactorubra, was described in 1965 by Winston Ponder, differentiated by its proportionately longer spire and different colour pattern. While Ponder noted a similarity of Pisinna rekohuana lactorubra to Pisinna zosterophila, he believed it was best to classify it as a subspecies of Pisinna rekohuana, due to its distribution and the relationships of forms between the three groups.

The species measures 2.0mm, by 0.9mm, while the subspecies Pisinna rekohuana lactorubra measures 3.2mm by 1.5mm.

Distribution

The species is endemic to New Zealand. The holotype was collected by Powell himself in February 1933 at Waitangi, Chatham Islands. It is found around the South Island, in the waters of the Chatham Islands, commonly at Stewart Island, the Auckland Islands and the Kermadec Islands.

Pisinna rekohuana lactorubra is primarily found to the north-east of North Island under stones in the littoral zone, preferring open coasts. It has been identified on Manawatāwhi / Three Kings Islands, the Manukau Harbour on the west coast of the North Island, and the Mahia Peninsula.

Since the subspecies was first described, Pisinna rekohuana rekohuana has been identified as living in the range previously thought to be that of Pisinna rekohuana lactorubra, such as the north-east coast of the North Island, and the Mahia Peninsula.

References

Anabathridae
Gastropods described in 1933
Gastropods of New Zealand
Endemic fauna of New Zealand
Endemic molluscs of New Zealand
Molluscs of the Pacific Ocean
Taxa named by Arthur William Baden Powell